The Coronado Hotel, at 410 E. 9th St. in Tucson, Arizona, was built in 1928.  It was listed on the National Register of Historic Places in 1982.

It is a prominent three-story Spanish Colonial-style building.  It was built as a 50-room hotel, conveniently just across diagonally from downtown Tucson's Southern Pacific Railroad Company Depot.

It was designed by Bill Winchester, a draftsman at T.C. Triplett Company.

References

National Register of Historic Places in Pima County, Arizona
Buildings and structures completed in 1928
Hotels in Arizona